The 2000–01 IBLA Development League was held on the Gold Coast, Australia between two venues, Palm Meadows and Carrara Oval. The league was competed between four teams: IBLA Australia, IBLA Internationals, MLB Stars and the Taiwan national baseball team.

IBLA Australia

IBLA Internationals

MLB Stars

Taiwan national baseball team

References 

International Baseball League of Australia team rosters
Team rosters